Heinz Günthardt and Balázs Taróczy were the defending champions but did not compete that year.

Peter Fleming and Guy Forget won in the final 6–4, 6–3 against Yannick Noah and Sherwood Stewart.

Seeds
The top four seeded teams received byes into the second round.

Draw

Finals

Top half

Bottom half

References
 1986 Pilot Pen Classic Doubles Draw

Pilot Pen Classic Doubles